Haplopteris elongata, commonly known as the tape fern, is a species of epiphytic fern. In eastern Australia, it grows in rainforests north from the Richmond River in the south, to tropical Queensland in the north.

References 

Pteridaceae
Flora of New South Wales
Flora of Queensland
Flora of tropical Asia
Flora of Africa
Flora of China